Ætla, who lived in the 7th century, is believed to be one of many Bishops of Dorchester during the Anglo-Saxon period.  The village of Attlebridge, Norfolk is named after him, as he is credited for the construction of a bridge ('brycg' in Old English) there.

Ætla was attested about 660. In the 670s, the seat of his bishopric was at Dorchester-on-Thames, which was then under Mercian control. He does not seem to have had any comparable predecessors or successors in that see.

Citations

References
 
 Powicke, F. Maurice and E. B. Fryde Handbook of British Chronology 2nd. ed. London:Royal Historical Society 1961

External links
 

Bishops of Dorchester (Mercia)
7th-century English bishops